Nazri Sabri is a footballer who plays for Home United as a goalkeeper in the S.League.

Club career

Nazri Sabri started his footballing career in Home United in the 2010 season, making his S.League debut against Beijing Guoan Talent on 2 August 2010. 

He then moved to Geylang United in the 2011 S.League season before returning to the Protectors in the 2012 S.League season. Nazri played nine matches for Home United that year including a S.League match against his former club Geylang United which ended 7-3 in favour of the Protectors. 

Nazri was released by Home United following the end of the 2012 S.League season and it was announced that he had joined Woodlands Wellington during the 2013 S.League mid season transfer window, coming in as a replacement for the injured Ahmadulhaq Che Omar, who tore his anterior crucial ligament earlier in the season. 

He made his debut for Woodlands Wellington in a 2013 Singapore League Cup match against his former employers, Home United, on 11 June 2013.

Club Career Statistics

All numbers encased in brackets signify substitute appearances.

References

External links

1989 births
Living people
Singaporean footballers
Woodlands Wellington FC players
Home United FC players
Geylang International FC players
Hougang United FC players
Association football goalkeepers
Singapore Premier League players